Those Who Pay With Their Lives is a 1989 Romanian drama film directed by Șerban Marinescu, and based on novels by Camil Petrescu. The film was selected as the Romanian entry for the Best Foreign Language Film at the 62nd Academy Awards, but was not accepted as a nominee.

Cast
 Ștefan Iordache, as Șerban Saru-Sinești
 Adrian Pintea, as Gelu Ruscanu
 Gheorghe Visu
 Marcel Iureș
 Ovidiu Ghiniță, as Ștefan Ladima
 Maia Morgenstern
 , as Nora
 Irina Petrescu
 Julieta Szönyi
 Șerban Cantacuzino
 
 Valentin Uritescu
 
 
 Bujor Macrin
 Dan Profiroiu

See also
 List of submissions to the 62nd Academy Awards for Best Foreign Language Film
 List of Romanian submissions for the Academy Award for Best Foreign Language Film

References

External links
 

1989 films
1989 drama films
Romanian drama films
1980s Romanian-language films